A salutation is a greeting used in a letter or other communication. Salutations can be formal or informal. The most common form of salutation in an English letter includes the recipient's given name or title. For each style of salutation there is an accompanying style of complimentary close, known as valediction. Examples of non-written salutations are bowing (common in Japan), waving, or even addressing somebody by their name. A salutation can be interpreted as a form of a signal in which the receiver of the salutation is being acknowledged, respected or thanked.
Another simple but very common example of a salutation is a military salute. By saluting another rank, that person is signalling or showing his or her acknowledgement of the importance or significance of that person and his or her rank. Some greetings are considered vulgar, others "rude" and others "polite".

Arabic
For formal correspondence, it is common to use:
 Sa'adat Assayid if the reader is male, and Sa'adat As'Sayyidah  if female. It is commonly followed by a full name.

For informal correspondence:
 Al akh if male, and Al okht if female, followed by a first name.
For more informal correspondence, Azizi if the reader is male, and Azizati if female. 
To address a group of people, A'ezza'e for informal correspondence, and in formal correspondence "Sadati" is commonly used and followed by Al A'ezza'a or "Almuhtarameen".
To add more formality, it is common to begin the salutation with Ela (to), followed by the salutation and a full name.

 Example:

 Azizi Ahmed, Azizati Sarah, A'ezza'e members of the team or Member of the team Al A'ezzaa.
Formal : Sa'adat Assayid Ahmed Abdullah, Sa'adat Assayidah Sarah Ibrahim, Sadati members of the team Almuh-tarameen.
Common salutation for both formal and informal correspondence : Sa'adat Alostath Ahmed Abdullah, Sa'adat Alostatha Sarah Ibrahim.
It is  common to conclude the salutation with a Doa such as May god bless him/her or May god protect him/her. This Concluding Doa comes right after the full name of the correspondent.

Bengali
The salutation "Dear" (প্রিয়) in combination with a name or a title is by far the most commonly used salutation in Bengali, in both formal and informal correspondence. It is commonly followed by either an honorific and a surname, such as "Shrôddheyô" or "Manônīyô" (শ্রদ্ধেয়/মাননীয়), or by a given name, such as "Shrôddheyô/Manônīyô John" (শ্রদ্ধেয়/মাননীয় জন). However, it is not common in Bengali to use both a title of address and a person's given name: "Shrôddheyô/Manônīyô John Smith" (শ্রদ্ধেয়/মাননীয় জন স্মিথ) would not be correct form.

If the name of the intended recipient is unknown, acceptable salutations are:
 Shrôddheyô (শ্রদ্ধেয়) (if the gender of the reader is unknown).
 Snehôr (স্নেহের) (if address someone younger).
 Jahar Prôti Iha prôjojyô (যাহার প্রতি ইহা প্রযোজ্য) (if the writer wishes to exclude the gender of the reader from the salutation and/or to convey that the reader should forward the copy to one more suited to receive or respond appropriately. Same as To Whom It May Concern).

Dutch
Dutch has two standard forms of salutation: one formal and the other informal. A person's title and surname always follow the salutation, regardless of formality. The formal salutation, "Geachte", is most commonly used in present formal communication, while the informal salutation "Beste" appears in informal communication. However, there is a tendency, especially among the younger generations, to also use this salutation in formal situations."
Use of professional titles, especially unabbreviated, is uncommon in Dutch correspondence.

The standard formal Dutch salutation is followed by a title, a name and a comma:
 Geachte heer <name>, (If the reader is Male).
 Geachte mevrouw <name>, (If the reader is Female).
 Geachte mejuffrouw <name>, (If the reader is Female, unmarried and younger than 25, this is very uncommon, archaic and nowadays considered patronizing).
 Geachte heer/mevrouw <name>, (If the gender of the reader is unknown).

The standard informal Dutch salutation is followed by a name and a comma:
 Beste <name>, (For either Male and Female readers).

If the informal Dutch salutation is used in a formal context, the salutation is followed by a title, a name and a comma:
 Beste meneer <name>, (If the reader is Male).
 Beste mevrouw <name>, (If the reader is Female).
 Beste meneer/mevrouw <name>, (if the gender of the reader is unknown).

In Dutch the following applies to <name> in salutations: 
In the Netherlands the (first) prefix of the name is always capitalized
In Belgium names are spelled slightly differently: prefixes are always written as they are in the register of residents, which can vary by name. In the vast majority of names, the (first) prefix is capitalized.

In Dutch if the first name or initial is included, the prefix is never capitalized. E.g. Dhr. Van den Berg (Mr. From the Mountain) is named Jan (John) so his name is written with first name as Jan van den Berg and with initials as J. van den Berg. This convention is also used when writing in Dutch to people of foreign nationality. The exception to this rule is when writing to a Flemish person. In that case the rule for Belgian names is used, and the surname prefixes are capitalized as registered.

English
The salutation "Dear" in combination with a name or a title is by far the most commonly used salutation in both British and US English, in both formal and informal correspondence. It is commonly followed either by an honorific and a surname, such as "Dear Mr. Smith," or by a given name, such as "Dear Mark."  However, it is not common in English to use both a title of address and a person's given name: "Dear Mr. John Smith" would not be common form. Sometimes, the salutation "To" is used for informal correspondence, for example "To Peter".

A comma follows the salutation and name, while a colon is used in place of a comma only in US business correspondence. This rule applies regardless of the level of formality of the correspondence.

If the name of the intended recipient is unknown, acceptable salutations are:
 Dear Sir or Madam (If the gender of the reader is unknown).
 To Whom It May Concern (If the writer wishes to exclude the gender of the reader from the salutation and/or to convey that the reader should forward the copy to one more suited to receive or respond appropriately).
 Dear Sir (If the reader is male).
 Dear Madam (If the reader is female).

In older British usage and current US usage, the abbreviations "Mx", "Ms", "Mr", "Dr", and "Mrs" are typically followed by a period (full stop), but it is common in recent British usage to drop the period after all such titles. Professional titles such as "Professor" are frequently used both in business and in social correspondence, as are those of dignitaries and holders of certain public offices, such as "Mr. President" or "Dear Madam Secretary".

"Mx." is an English–language neologistic honorific for use alongside Mr., Ms., etc. that does not indicate gender. It is often the only option for nonbinary people, as well as those who do not wish to reveal their gender. It is a gender-neutral title that is now accepted by much of the United Kingdom's government and some businesses in the United Kingdom.

"Ms." is the marital-status-neutral honorific for an adult woman and may be applied in cases in which the marital status is irrelevant or unknown to the author. For example, if one is writing a business letter to a woman, "Ms." is acceptable. "Mrs." denotes an adult female who is married. "Miss" can apply to specifically unmarried women, however, the term is being replaced more and more by "Ms." "Miss" can apply to an unmarried woman or more generally to a younger woman.

"Miss" is the proper form of address for female children and unmarried women, although some consider the latter use to be dated. "Master" is used in formal situations for addressing boys typically aged under 16, after which it is "Mr." "Master" in this case is of old English origin.

Messrs. or Messieurs is a historically used term to address many men rather than "Mr Pink, Mr White, et al." Messrs is the abbreviation (pronounced "messers") for messieurs and is used in English. Mesdames addresses many women; pronounced "Meydammes".

On occasion, one may use "Sir" or "Madam" by itself as the salutation, with nothing preceding.  The severe and old-fashioned formality of such a salutation makes it appropriate for very formal correspondence (for example, addressing a head of state, or a letter to the editor), but in the same way, the formality and stiffness of such a salutation would make its use in friendly social correspondence inappropriate.

French

Standard salutation
The standard French salutation uses the normal style of address to the recipient of the letter, followed by a comma:
 Monsieur, for a man.
 Madame, for a woman (the former distinction between a young or hopefully unmarried woman, with its distinct salutation, Mademoiselle, and an adult or married woman, Madame, is now considered rude; indeed, the usage of "Mademoiselle" has been prohibited in official documents since 2012).

When writing specifically to a female where her marital status is irrelevant and/or unknown, the author should use Madame, unless she is a child. When writing to an adult woman, one uses Madame, unless one knows the person prefers Mademoiselle.

According to a traditional custom which is sometimes still followed by some people, one could also use Mademoiselle when writing to a female artist (actress, singer, etc.), regardless of the marital status and age of the person.

When the gender of the person to whom one is writing is unknown, the appropriate salutation is (on two lines)
 Madame,
 Monsieur,

In the case where the author knows the recipient well or is on friendly terms with him or her, one may add Cher/Chère in front of the address:
 Cher Monsieur,
 Chère Mademoiselle, (though this may be considered inappropriate for a male author who is not a close family relative of the recipient)
 Chère Madame,

A salutation using Chère/Cher and a title (Madame/Monsieur/Docteur) followed by a person's name (e.g. Cher Monsieur Dupuis) used to be considered incorrect. However, maybe following English usage, such a construction is now rather common and deemed relatively formal.

In case the author and the recipients are close friends or intimates, one may use the given name of the recipient immediately after Cher/Chère.

In case they are family, they may use their familial link preceded by Cher/Chère. This is almost compulsory if the author is a younger member of the family (child to parent, nephew to aunt/uncle, grandchild to grandparent, godchild to godparent) and is left to the author's discretion in other cases.

In French, the abbreviation for Monsieur is M.—the English "Mr." is incorrect though often used, especially by banks.

Specific salutations

If the recipient holds a specific title, it must be inserted after the Monsieur/Madame:
 Monsieur/Madame le Président, ("Mr./Madam President)
 Monsieur/Madame l'Ambassadeur, ("Mr./Madam Ambassador)
 Monsieur/Madame le Chancelier, ("Mr./Madam Chancellor)
 Monsieur/Madame le (Premier) Ministre, ("Mr./Madam (Prime) Minister)
 Monsieur/Madame le Directeur, ("Mr./Madam Director)
 Monsieur/Madame le Professeur, ("Mr./Madam Professor)
In this case, one should always use Madame, and never Mademoiselle. In Québécois usage, many titles will be rendered in the feminine, contrary to practice in France (i.e. Madame la Présidente, Madame la Professeure, Madame la Directrice.)

In some cases, the wife of a dignitary may be entitled to a special address:
 Madame l'Ambassadrice, (for the wife of an ambassador)
 Madame la Générale, (for the wife of an officer)
 Madame la Colonelle, (for the wife of a colonel)

If the recipient is a doctor, it is possible to use Docteur, or, more formally, Monsieur/Madame le Docteur, or, more casually, Cher Docteur, as salutation.
This is often done for doctors of medicine. For other doctors, it is not common, even if the use is increasing, following the Anglo-Saxon custom. Basically one has to be consistent with the address: a letter sent to "Dr N. N." will use a salutation formula including Docteur, whereas a letter sent to "M./Mme N. N." will not.

If the recipient is a lawyer, notary (or various other legal positions), the proper salutation will be Maître ("Master").
The same salutation is used for famous writers, painters, and for members of the Académie française.

For some specific professions (lawyers, physicians, for instance), two persons exercising the same such profession will always use Cher Confrère (feminine: Chère Consœur).

The address may vary when writing to dignitaries. For instance, one will use:
 for monarchs and members of their families or high nobility:
 for a king/queen: Sire, / Madame,
 for a sovereign prince/princess, a sovereign duke/duchess, a prince/princess of royal blood, a pretendent to a throne, etc. : Monseigneur,  ("Mylord") / Madame,
 for a non sovereign prince or a French Duke: Prince, / Princesse,
 for Catholic or Orthodox clerics:
 for the Pope: Très Saint Père, humblement prosterné aux pieds de Votre Sainteté et implorant la faveur de la bénédiction apostolique,  ("Most Holy Father, humbly bowing down before the feet of Your Holiness and begging for the favour of the apostolic benediction,")
 for the Ecumenical Patriarch of Constantinople: Très Saint Père, ("Most Holy Father")
 Monsieur le Cardinal, or less formally Éminence, (formerly (Illustrissime et) Éminentissime Seigneur, "(Most Illustrious and) Most Eminent Lord", now disused) for a Cardinal of the Roman Catholic Church
 for a papal nunzio, Monseigneur, in private correspondence, and Monsieur le Nonce, for official uses
 for a Catholic prelate or a Catholic or Orthodox bishop, archbishop or patriarch: Monseigneur, ("Mylord"). For bishops/archbishops/patriarchs it is possible to be more formal and write Monseigneur l'Évèque / l'Archevêque / le Patriarche,
 for the superior of a Catholic or Orthodox religious order: Mon Très Révérend Père or Révérendissime Père / Ma Très Révérende Mère or Révérendissime Mère ("Most Reverend Father/Mother"). Various specific salutations exist for some orders.
 for a Catholic or Orthodox parish priest / archpriest / priest: Mon Père or Monsieur le Curé / l'Archiprêtre / l'Abbé
 for a monk: Mon Père ("My Father") or Mon Frère ("My Brother"), depending on the order
 for a nun: Ma Mère ("My Mother") or Ma Sœur ("My Sister"), depending on the order
 if the writer knows well the priest/monk/nun recipient, it is possible to use (Très) Cher Père, (Très) Cher Frère, (Très) Chère Mère, (Très) Chère Sœur,: "(Most) Dear Father/Brother/Mother/Sister".
 for members of the armed forces:
 for a navy general officer: Admiral,
 for a male general officer (except navy): a male writer will use Mon Général, and a female writer Général,
 for a female general officer (except navy): Général,
 for a navy superior officer: Commandant
 for a male superior officer (except navy): a male writer will use Mon Colonel / Mon Commandant, and a female writer Colonel / Commandant according to the rank of the officer,
 for a female superior officer (except navy): Colonel / Commandant according to the rank of the officer,
 for other members of the army: Monsieur / Madame.

German
German has two types of general salutations that are mutually distinguishable from one another—a formal and an informal form.

The formal form distinguishes between the male or female gender of the recipient as a matter of courtesy. The male formal salutation begins with Sehr geehrter Herr, while the female formal salutation begins with Sehr geehrte Frau. Both formal salutations are followed by the recipient's academic degree (if any) and the recipient's family name (e.g. Sehr geehrter Herr Schmidt or Sehr geehrte Frau Dr. Schmidt). It is possible but uncommon to include the full name (e.g. Sehr geehrter Herr Johann Schmidt). With an unknown recipient, Sehr geehrte Damen und Herren (meaning Dear Sir or Madam) is used with no variation on this. Due to insufficient functionality of computer software used for mass communication, some companies tend to use more clumsy gender neutral formal salutations (e. g. Sehr geehrte(r) Herr/ Frau Schmidt).

Informal salutations in German tend to begin with Hallo, meaning "hello", which is used universally, written and spoken, and which is gender neutral. Depending on the region, informal salutations also tend to begin with Moin (north of Hannover), Servus (typically in the south and south west), or other words, although only used by locals. A more personal informal salutation begins with Lieber (male) or Liebe (female), meaning "dear", (e.g. Lieber Paul, Liebe Annette)—the latter should only be used if the recipient has been actually met in person or similar. It should be used with care because it can be otherwise perceived as patronizing or inappropriate, depending on the difference in age or social status.

Specific salutations appear in German very similar to the way they do in English, with the exception that in the address block of a letter German must include all or multiple salutations that can be abbreviated Herr Dr. Schmidt, or Herr Prof. Dr.-Ing. Dr. h.c. Krämer, and can leave out the Herr or Frau. While in the opening of a letter the direct salutation is reduced to only the most important title Sehr geehrter Herr Dr. Schmidt, or Sehr geehrter Herr Professor Krämer. The same applies to female variant, Sehr geehrte Frau Prof. Krämer.

Further details in the German Wikipedia article :de:Anrede.

Hindi
In position of the English "Dear" are the words पूज्य (Pūjya), आदरणीय (Ādaraṇīya), or प्रिय(Priya) (from most formal to most informal), for social writing (e.g., relatives/friends). They would not usually be used for business writing. The second may be used in some instances, for example if writing to a teacher.

Formal ways of salutation include "Shri", "Sriman", "Shrimati", "Chiranjīv", "Chiranjīvī.  Of these, "Shri" and "Shrimaan" are used to respectfully address married (or presumed married) men. "Shrimati" (Abbr: "Smt.") is used for married women.

Shri is most commonly used salutation in Hindi for a married male, while for a married woman, Shrimati is used. For unmarried and young boys Kumar is used, whereas Kumari is the salutation used for unmarried and young girls.

Italian

Standard salutation
The standard Italian salutation uses the normal style of address to the recipient of the letter, followed by a comma:
 Egregio Signore for a man (or Signor if followed by the surname).
 Gentile Signorina for a single woman but it is seldom used in current italian.
 Gentile Signora for a married woman or a single woman (once it was used also for a single woman of high rank or age)

Specific salutations

If the recipient holds a specific title:
 Signor/Signora Presidente ("Mr./Mrs. President; sometimes the alternative feminine form Presidentessa can be used)
 Egregio Dottor(e)/Gentile Dottoressa for anyone holding a university degree and professional journalists (Dottor if followed by surname)
 Egregio Professor(e)/Gentile Professoressa for high-school teachers, university junior professors, and professional orchestra performers
 Chiarissimo Professore/Chiarissima Professoressa for university senior professors
 Magnifico Rettore/Magnifica Rettrice for university rectors
 Maestro/Maestra for orchestra directors, choir directors and soloists

Malayalam
Written salutation includes "Sreeman/Sree" (ശ്രീമാൻ/ശ്രീ) for men and "Sreemathi" (ശ്രീമതി) for women. The language also uses Bahumaanappetta, Aadaranieya (ബഹുമാനപ്പെട്ട, ആദരണീയ) for both genders which has a meaning similar to `Respected` in English. In Malayalam, a formal speech begins with Namaskaaram, Vandanam (നമസ്കാരം, വന്ദനം) and ends with Krithanjatha, Nandi (കൃതജ്ഞത, നന്ദി)

Persian
In Persian language, formal and informal phrases are used for salutation and they are referred to as ehteramat (احترامات):

Formal salutation
Written by/for officials, a letter normally starts with the followings:
 Besmehi ta'ala (بسمه تعالی), in his almighty name.
 Be name Khoda (به نام خدا), in the name of God.
 Besmellahe Rahmane Rahim (بسم الله الرحمن الرحیم), a Quranic phrase for in the name of God.

Titles:
 Jenabe Aghaye (جناب آقای), used for writing formal letter to men.
 Sarkare Khanome (سرکار خانم), for writing formal letter to women.
If the corresponding person is a doctor or holds Ph.D, or he or she is an engineer, Doktor (دکتر) or Mohandes (مهندس) must be added to the titles respectively. Same rules is practiced in military environments.

Following the above-mentioned titles, different types of salutations may be used:
 Salam Alaykom (سلام علیکم), Salam to you, following the above-mentioned titles.
 Ba salam va ehteram (با سلام و احترام), with (my) greetings and regards.
 Ba dorood va salam (با درود و سلام), with (my) greetings and regards; dorood is Persian term meaning hello.

Portuguese

Formal salutations
The standard formal Portuguese salutation uses an addressing expression such as Caro (Dear) or Excelentíssimo Senhor (Most Excellent Sir), followed by the addressee titles (e.g. Eng.) and addressee name.

Most expressions must be modified to account for addressee gender and number. Caro, for example, becomes:
 Caro for a man;
 Caros for a group of men or a mixed group of men and women;
 Cara for a woman;
 Caras for a group of women.

The formal expression Excelentíssimo Senhor is often abbreviated as:
Exmo. Sr. for a man;
Exma. Sra. for a woman;

Addressee titles can be professional and are often preceded by Sr. (Mr.) and almost always abbreviated (e.g. Arquitecto – Arq. (Architect), Engenheiro – Eng. (Engineer), Padre – Pe. (Priest)). An exception to this rule is the Medical Doctor (Médico Doutor), often addressed as Doutor, being the abbreviation Dr. instead used to address anyone holding a baccalaureate degree. Each military or ecclesiastic rank has one abbreviation, and, historically, nobility ranks also had one—for example, one of the ways of addressing the Portuguese Monarch would be Sua Majestade (Your Majesty) abbreviated as S.M. .

The title Sr. (Mr.) can also be used on its own, when appropriate.

Informal salutations
Informal salutations may or may not be followed by the name of the addressee, and almost never contain any titles.
 Olá (hello)
 Oi (hi)
 Querido / Querida (informally, Dear)

Romanian

Formal salutations 
When addressing a formal letter whose recipient is not known by name, the salutation of preference is Stimate Domn, Stimată Doamnă (equivalent to Dear Sir or Madam in English). When the recipient is known by name, Stimate Domnule or Stimată Doamnă, followed by the person's last name, is used for a man or a woman respectively. For unmarried women, Stimată Domnișoară is acceptable for close relations, though this title is falling out of use in written communication and can be considered inappropriate or offensive.

Examples:
 Stimate Domn, Stimată Doamnă (used when the reader is unknown)
 Stimate Domnule Ungureanu, (used when the reader is a man and his last name is known—this is the most commonly used version)
 Stimată Doamnă Ungureanu,(the reader is a woman and the last name is known, the most commonly used version)

When the addressee has additional titles, such as Doctor or Profesor, they are interposed between Domnule/Doamnă and the person's last name, although it is sometimes acceptable to drop the last name altogether when the intended recipient is clear. It is also preferred to write out a person's title when addressing a letter and abbreviations such as Prof. or Acad. are best avoided. An exception is Dr. for Doctor, which is still acceptable in the salutation. If the recipient has multiple titles, generally only the most important one is used.

For women, it is current practice to use the masculine form of the title, preferring, for instance, Doamnă Director instead of Doamnă Directoare. Some titles may lose their intended meaning when used in their feminine form. For instance, Profesor/Profesoară are titles which may be associated with a male/female school teacher. When used to mean a university professor (profesor universitar), however, only the masculine form carries this meaning. The feminine profesoară universitară is not in common use.

Examples for use of titles:
 Stimate Domnule Dr. Ungureanu; Stimate Domnule Doctor (the former shows more respect)
 Stimate Domnule Profesor Ungureanu; Stimate Domnule Profesor; Stimate Domnule Prof. Ungureanu (first two versions are better)
 Stimate Domnule Academician; Stimate Domnule Academician Mihai Ungureanu
 Stimată Doamnă Director; Stimată Doamnă Directoare (the former is the recommended version)

In very formal situations there can be slight variations in the choice of wording. Most often, more emphasis is added to the adjective stimat (esteemed), becoming mult stimat (much esteemed) or onorat (honoured). When addressing groups, the latter is preferred.

Examples:
 Mult stimate Domnule Director (for a director, man)
 Mult stimată Doamnă Președinte (for a president, woman)
 Onorate Domnule Ungureanu (understood as something like: "Honoured Mr. ...", is used in formal letters, usually has the same power as "Mult stimate ...")
 Onorată Comisie (addressed to a group of people, for example a commission)
 Onorați Reprezentanți (addressed to a group of representatives)
 Stimați/Onorați Participanți (both versions are good, addressed to a group of participants)

Informal salutations 

The most widespread salutation for informal letters is, by a large margin, dragă (equivalent to English dear). This can be used independently of the recipient's gender and is normally followed by the first name. An alternative which is less familiar is salut (equivalent to English hi, hello), followed by the first name. This version is typical of the workplace, where using dragă would be too familiar.

Examples:
 Dragă Ruxanda; Dragă Mihai (used usually with the first name)
 Salut Ruxanda; Salut Mihai

Other 

During Romania's communist period, it was generally frowned upon to use domn/doamnă (meaning Mr./Mrs.) to address people, preferring tovarăș (comrade) or cetățean (citizen) instead. This was reflected in written communication from that period. Today, society has reverted to using domn/doamnă as the standard way to address or refer to others. Today, salutations using the distinctly communist-sounding tovarăș or cetățean are only used in closed communist circles or humorously.

Examples:
 Stimate Tovarășe Ungureanu; Stimată Cetățeancă Ungureanu; Stimate Cetățean Ungureanu

The oldest surviving document written in Romanian, a 16th-century letter from a Wallachian boyar to the mayor of Brașov, contained a salutation in Slavonic, a lingua franca of the region at that time.
Mudromu I plemenitomu, I cistitomu I B[o]gom darovannomu zupan Hanăș Begner ot Brașov mnog[o] zdravie ot Nécșul ot Dlugopole. (To the most wise and noble and honoured and by God gifted master Hanăș Bengner [that is, Johannes Benkner] from Brașov, much health from Neacșu from Câmpulung.)

Russian 
In letters and during conversations, Russian speakers use
 Уважаемый / Уважаемая (according to gender – M/F)
 Многоуважаемый / Многоуважаемая
 Глубокоуважаемый / Глубокоуважаемая

followed by the given name and patronymic.
Salutations to unknown parties usually include an honorific like
 Гражданин / Гражданка
 Господин / Госпожа
 Товарищ

Examples:
 Уважаемый господин Иванов
 Уважаемая госпожа Иванова

In less formal conversations it is possible to use
 Молодой человек (addressing a young man)
 Девушка (addressing a young woman)

Spanish 
Informal salutations
 "Hola" / "Hola" (+ name). Every time, everywhere, oral or written.
 "Hola a todos". Addressed to a group of people, whether their names are known or not.

Intermediate salutations. Not as simple as "hola" but can be used in every situation. These can be used in oral or written Spanish.
 Buenos días. To be used from when you wake up to Noon or 1pm. Equivalent to good morning.
 Buenas tardes. To be used from Noon or 1pm up to the sunset. Equivalent to good afternoon.
 Buenas noches. From the sunset to the moment that you go to bed. Equivalent to good evening and good night.

Formal salutations. Only written.
 "Estimado" (+ name or title "Señor". "Sr." is the abbreviation). For male. Example for a man called Juan García: "Estimado Juan" or "Estimado Sr. García". The last is more formal.
 "Estimada" (+ name or title "Señora". "Sra." is the abbreviation). For female. Example for a woman called Ana Sánchez: "Estimada Ana" or "Estimada Sra. Sánchez". The last is more formal.
 "Estimados amigos" (plural) When your letter is addressed to a group of people.
 "Estimado amigo" or "Querido amigo" (male or unknown gender). You may or not know the name of the person.
 "Estimada amiga" or "Querida amiga" (female). 
 "Estimadas amigas" (a group of females).
 "Excelentísimo Señor" (+name or without it) or "Excelentísima Señora" (female). This is extremely formal and is usually reserved for certain formal procedures with the government. You can also use "Ilustrísimo" (male) or "Ilustrísima" (female) instead of "Excelentísimo".

Formal Letter to unknown receipt.

 A quien corresponda

Tamil 
Written salutations are 
"Thiru/Thiruvalar" "திரு/திருவாளர்" for men, 
"Thirumathi"/"திருமதி" for women, 
"Selvi/Thiruniraiselvi" "செல்வி/திருநிறைச்செல்வி" for unmarried women 
"Selvan/Thiruniraiselvan" "செல்வன்/திருநிறைச்செல்வன்" for unmarried men
"Amarar (Marar) / Vaanor" "அமரர் (மரர்) / வானோர்" for Deceased person.

Telugu 
Various forms of salutation in Telugu are as follows: "Sri / Shri" ( శ్రీ ) is used to address men, "Srimathi / Shrimathi" ( శ్రీమతి ) is reserved for married woman. Unmarried girls are usually addressed as "Kumari" ( కుమారి ). In addressing a person in letter, usually in case of elders, "Poojyulaina" (పూజ్యులైన / పూజ్యనీయులైన) is often used although "Ganga Bhagirathi Samanulaina" ( గంగా భాఘీరతి సమానులైన )is used for female elders. When addressing a person  who is younger, "Chiranjeevi" ( చిరంజీవి ) is commonly used irrespective of all genders. "Kumari" ( కుమారి ) is sometimes used for unmarried women and "Chiranjeevi Lakshmi Sowbhagyavathi ( చిరంజీవి లక్ష్మీ సౌభాగ్యవతి ), Chi. La. Sow. ( ఛి. ల. సౌ. ) in short for married women

In addition, a suffix "garu" ( గారు ) is added as a respect or to address an elderly person irrespective of gender.

Example:

శ్రీ నరసింహ రాజు గారు, (Mr. Narasimharaju,)
పూజ్యనీయులైన నాన్నగారికి, (Respectful Father,)
కుమారి వందన, (Miss Vandana)
శ్రీమతి సుబ్బలక్ష్మి గారికి, (Mrs. Subbalakshmi)
గంగా భాఘీరతి సమానులైన శ్రీమతి సూర్య కుమారి గారికి, (Mrs. Suryakumari)
చిరంజీవి గౌతం సాగర్, (Little Master Gowtham Sagar)
చిరంజీవి శ్రీజన్య, (Little Miss Sreejanya,)

చిరంజీవి లక్ష్మీ సౌభాగ్యవతి చందన కు, (Mrs. Chandana,)
ఛి. ల. సౌ. చందన కు, (Mrs. Chandana,)

Turkish
In Turkish, there are two forms of salutations, formal and informal. Like most other languages, gender doesn't play a role in the salutation. When addressing somebody in formal writing, one can use "Sayın Surname" without having to refer to the gender. If the title of the recipient is known, it is better to use it in place of the name, as in "Sayın Doktor".

In a formal salutation, if the recipient's name is unknown, one uses "Sayın Yetkili", which is similar to "Dear Sir/Madam" in English.

If the name and the gender of the intended recipient is known though, acceptable salutations are;

Hanim (if the intended recipient is female),
Bey (if the intended recipient is male).

These salutations are used with the first names. When the surname is intended to be used, it is combined with "Sayin" instead. If a lady is named "Nihan Erten" for instance, she is referred to as either "Nihan Hanim" or "Sayin Erten".

When an older person salutes a younger one in a formal way, he/she can refer to the younger person as "Hanim kizim" for females and "Bey oglum" for males where "kizim" is intended as "daughter" and "oglum" is intended as "son". In the informal way "Kizim" and "Oglum" are enough without having to use "Hanim/Bey".

In an informal salutation, one can also use "Sevgili Name", which has almost the same meaning with "Dear Name".

Ukrainian 
In correspondence and during conversations, Ukrainian speakers use the words "Шановний/Шановна" (Shanovnyy/Shanovna) or "Вельмишановний/Вельмишановна" (according to male/female gender) as a salutation, followed by the given name (sometimes also uses patronymic). Salutation to unknown persons often use "Пане/Пані" (Pane/Pani) (according to gender) or "Панове", "Панство" (Panove/Panstvo) (to unknown parties).

See also 
Valediction
English honorifics, e.g. Miss, Mrs, Ms, Mr, Sir, Dr, Lady, Lord
Honorifics (other nations)
Forms of address, i.e. Styles and manner of address
Salute
Salutatorian
Sir

References

Further reading

External links 
 

Greeting words and phrases
Letters (message)

de:Anrede